The year 1879 in architecture involved some significant events.

Events
 Autumn – Proposals to reconstruct the west front of St Mark's Basilica in Venice are criticised by the Society for the Protection of Ancient Buildings in Britain.

Buildings and structures

Buildings

 The Linderhof Palace in Bavaria, designed by Georg Dollman is completed.
 Grand Théâtre de Genève in Geneva, Switzerland opens on 2 October.
 St. Patrick's Cathedral (Manhattan) in New York City, designed by James Renwick, Jr., is dedicated.
 The Votive Church, Vienna, Austria, designed by Heinrich von Ferstel, is dedicated.
 Connecticut State Capitol in Hartford, Connecticut, designed by Richard M. Upjohn, is completed.
 Healy Hall at Georgetown University in Washington, D.C., designed by Paul J. Pelz and John L. Smithmeyer, is completed.
 Provident Life & Trust Company in Philadelphia, Pennsylvania, designed by Frank Furness, is completed.

Awards
 RIBA Royal Gold Medal – Marquis de Vogue
 Grand Prix de Rome, architecture: Victor-Auguste Blavette

Births

 June 6 – Patrick Abercrombie, English town planner (died 1957)
 July 1 – H. Craig Severance, American architect (died 1941)
 September 16 – Josep Maria Jujol, Catalan architect (died 1949)

Deaths
 May 15 – Gottfried Semper, German architect (born 1803)
 September 17 – Eugène Viollet-le-Duc, French architect and architectural theorist (born 1814)

References

Architecture
Years in architecture
19th-century architecture